Kim Hee-chul (born July 10, 1983), better known mononymously as Heechul, is a South Korean singer, songwriter, presenter and actor.

Awards and nominations

State and cultural honors

Listicles

See also 
 List of awards and nominations received by Super Junior

Notes

References 

Awards
Kim Hee-chul